Atlas is a popular monthly Turkish magazine, with accentuated photographic and other imagery content, covering a range of subjects from geography and environment to history and culture.

History and profile
Atlas has been published since April 1993. The magazine is part of Doğan Media Group (Doğan Holding). The publisher is Doğan Burda Rizzoli. The headquarters is in Istanbul.

References

External links
 Atlas magazine web site

1993 establishments in Turkey
Geographic magazines
Magazines established in 1993
Magazines published in Istanbul
Monthly magazines published in Turkey
Turkish-language magazines
Tourism magazines